Shermi Ulahannan is a representative for India in the sport of Kabaddi. she was a member of the team that won a gold medal in the 2010 Asian Games in Guangzhou.

she is from the Konnakkad locality of Malom village in Kasaragod district, Kerala. She studied in GHSS Maloth Kasaba, Vallikkadav.

She is a gold medal winner in the Asian beach Kabbadi games, 2008 in Bali (Indonesia). She was former Kerala women's kabbadi team captain. She is the first woman from Kerala to win an Asian Games gold medal in Kabbadi. She married Mr. Nimmy Sebastian on 25 October 2015. She is working in The Government Secretariat Kerala, since March 2011.

References

Living people
Sportswomen from Kerala
Indian kabaddi players
Asian Games medalists in kabaddi
Kabaddi players at the 2010 Asian Games
People from Kasaragod district
Female kabaddi players
21st-century Indian women
21st-century Indian people
Asian Games gold medalists for India
Year of birth missing (living people)
Medalists at the 2010 Asian Games